Clube Ferroviário de Pemba, or simply Pemba, is a Mozambique multi sports club from Pemba especially known for its football.

The team plays in Moçambola.

Stadium
Currently the team plays at the 10000 capacity Estadio Municipal CFM.

References

External links

Soccerway

Football clubs in Mozambique